Graham Jenkin (born Graham Keith Jenkin, 17 May 1938) is an Australian poet, historian, composer, and educator.

Graham Jenkin was born in Adelaide and educated at various country schools and at Prince Alfred College, Wattle Park Teachers College, and the University of Adelaide from where he has received an MA. His Master's degree thesis later became the basis of his book Conquest of the Ngarrindjeri. He received a PhD from the University of South Australia.  He spent two years  working as a jackeroo on stations in northern South Australia.  In 1961, he founded the Tea and Damper Club which was devoted to the preservation of Australian folklore, music and poetry.

From 1963 to 1965, he was Head Teacher of Coober Pedy Primary School.

In 1966, Graham Jenkin was appointed as a lecturer at Wattle Park Teachers College and then its successor institution the University of South Australia.

In 1968 Graham Jenkin, together with his wife Robyn Jenkin, Tony Strutton and Brenton Tregloan, formed The Overlanders, a group which performed Bush Songs and Bush Ballads. The Overlanders produced records, including Songs of the Breaker (1980) and Songs of the Great Australian Balladists (1978).

In 1996, Graham Jenkin was awarded the title of National Non-Indigenous Person of the Year, by the National Aboriginal and Islander Day Observance Committee (NAIDOC), for services to Aboriginal history.

Works 

 Favourite Australian bush songs, (with Lionel Long), Adelaide, Rigby, 1964.
 Two years on Bardunyah Station, Adelaide, Pitjantjara, 1967.
 The famous race for Wombat's lace, Adelaide, Rigby, 1977.
 Songs of the great Australian Balladists, Adelaide, Rigby, 1978. Second edition published in 1983 by the Education Department of South Australia.
 Conquest of the Ngarrindjeri, Adelaide, Rigby, 1979. Winner, 1978 SA Biennial Literature Prize Winner, 1979 Wilke Award for Australian non-fiction
 Songs of the Breaker, Adelaide, Book Agencies, 1980.
 The head teacher, Adelaide, Education Department of SA, 1980.
 Convict times, (jointly), Adelaide, Omnibus, 1981.
 The ballad of the Blue Lake bunyip, Adelaide, Omnibus, 1982
 Calling me home, Adelaide, SACAE, 1989.
 The Bardunyah ballads, Sydney, Simtrak, 1992
 Meralte: the boat, Adelaide, JB Publishing, 2003.
 The songs from Meralte, Adelaide, JB Publishing, 2003.

References

External links 
 The bushverse web site

Australian historians
1938 births
Living people
Australian children's writers
Australian male composers
Australian composers
Australian poets
People educated at Prince Alfred College